Midnight at the Movies is the second studio album by Justin Townes Earle, released on March 3, 2009 on Bloodshot Records.

Critical reception 

Midnight at the Movies received generally favorable reviews from music critics.

Track listing

Personnel 
Justin Townes Earle – lead vocals, acoustic guitar and resonator
Bryn Davies – bass and harmony vocals
Pete Finney – steel guitar and dobro
Josh Hedley – fiddle
Brian Owings – drums
Steve Poulton – vibraphone
Skylar Wilson – bandleader, piano, organ, wurlitzer and vibraphone
Cory Younts – banjo, mandolin, harmonica, harmony vocals, piano and whistling

References 

2009 albums
Bloodshot Records albums
Justin Townes Earle albums